The 2017 African Fencing Championships were held in Cairo, Egypt from 8 to 12 June.

Medal summary

Men's events

Women's events

Medal table
 Host

References

2017
African Fencing Championships
International fencing competitions hosted by Egypt
2017 in Egyptian sport